Tatra banka is a commercial bank in Slovakia. It was founded in 1990 as the first private bank in Slovakia. It took the name of the former bank, established in 1885, but not its assets. It started financial operations in December 1991.

As of 1 January 2018, it had 106 branches, 16 commercial business centers and 3,500 employees. Tatra banka is a member of the Austrian Raiffeisen Bank International AG.

Headquarters
 Tatra banka, a.s., Hodžovo námestie 3, 811 06 Bratislava, Slovakia

Awards 

 Bank of the Year, 2018: for the 14th year in a row, the British financial magazine Euromoney awarded Tatra banka the title of "Best Slovak Bank". The bank was also named "Best Bank" by Global Finance and EMEA Finance magazines.
 The bank’s private banking service defended its leading position in Slovakia in 2018, when it received the "Best Private Bank" title from EMEA Finance.
 Global Finance magazine granted Tatra Banka the "Best Digital Bank in Slovakia" award.

References

External links
 Tatra banka official site

Banks of Slovakia
Banks established in 1990
Banks under direct supervision of the European Central Bank
Slovakian companies established in 1990